Bockris is a surname. Notable people with the surname include:

John Bockris (1923–2013), American scientist
Victor Bockris (born 1949), English writer